Just Be Bop is a jazz album recorded by pianist Toshiko Akiyoshi in 1980 and released in Japan on the Discomate record label.

Track listing
LP side A
"Kelo" (Johnson) – 5:02 
"But Beautiful" (Van Heusen) – 5:15 
"Serpent's Tooth" (Heath) – 5:25 
"Mobious Trip" (Huffsteter) – 4:29 
LP side B
"Con Alma" (Gillespie) – 8:10 
"I Thought About You" (Mercer, Van Heusen) – 4:39 
"Joy Spring" (Brown) – 7:38

Personnel
Toshiko Akiyoshi – piano 
Charles McPherson – alto saxophone
Steve Huffsteter – trumpet, (flugelhorn on "Con Alma" and "I thought About You")
Roy McCurdy – drums 
Bob Bowman – bass (except "Kelo" and "But Beautiful")
Gene Cherico – bass (on "Kelo" and "But Beautiful")

References / External Links
Discomate DSP 8102

Toshiko Akiyoshi albums
1980 albums